Richard Everett Warner (October 6, 1861 – October 1, 1931) was an American businessman and  politician who served as the Mayor of Taunton, Massachusetts.

On December 3, 1901, Warner defeated John O'Hearn, the incumbent Democratic mayor.  Warner received 3,002 voted against 2,023 for O'Hearn. 

On December 6, 1904, Mayor Warner lost the election to independent Republican candidate John H. Eldredge by 65 votes.

Notes

1861 births
Mayors of Taunton, Massachusetts
1931 deaths